The Anastasian Wall (Greek: ,) or the Long Walls of Thrace (Greek: , ; Turkish: Uzun Duvar) is an ancient stone and turf fortification located  west of Istanbul, Turkey, built by the Eastern Roman Empire during the late 5th century.

Construction
It ran from north to south through the locations what are today Karacaköy, Gümüşpınar, Pınarca, Kurfallı, Fener, Alipaşa Neighborhood and Silivri Altınorak. Remains of the wall are visible in Gümüşpınar junction in Karacaköy, Hisartepe in Yalıköy, Pınarca in İhsaniye and Kurfallı village. The wall was part of an additional outer defense system for Constantinople, capital of the Eastern Roman Empire and probably continued in use until the 7th century.

The wall was named after the Emperor Anastasius I. However, there is evidence that the fortification already existed in 469 during the reign of Leo I and in 478 in the era of Zeno, and it was maintained and renewed by Anastasius in the time from 507 to 512. It was built complete with towers, gates, forts, ditches and a military way to protect Constantinople from invasions from the west by Huns, Slavs and Bulgars.

Effectiveness
It is known that the wall had only a limited effectiveness, and various groups attacking Constantinople penetrated it many times, because the fortification's length made it difficult to defend the wall completely by a limited garrison, and also because the wall was not sufficiently strong due to its hasty construction.

The wall fell into ruin after it was abandoned in the 7th century because of the difficulty of keeping it manned and repaired. Over the centuries, the stone of more than half of the total length was reused in other local buildings. It is best preserved in the woodlands of the northern sector.

See also
Walls of Constantinople
List of walls

References

Sources

 
Archaeological sites in the Marmara Region
Buildings and structures in Istanbul
Walls
Ruins in Turkey
Buildings and structures completed in the 5th century
Ancient Thrace
Silivri
Çatalca
Byzantine walls in Turkey
Roman fortifications in Thrace
5th-century fortifications
Linear earthworks
History of Istanbul